Bovino Cathedral is a Roman Catholic cathedral in Bovino, region of Apulia, Italy, dedicated to the Assumption of the Virgin Mary. Formerly the episcopal seat of the Diocese of Bovino, it has been since 1986 a co-cathedral in the Archdiocese of Foggia-Bovino.

The site is an ancient one, but the cathedral was destroyed in an earthquake in 1930 and the present building is a 20th-century reconstruction, re-consecrated in 1936.

The cathedral was granted the status of a minor basilica in 1970.

See also 
Catholic Church in Italy

References

Roman Catholic cathedrals in Italy
Cathedrals in Apulia
Churches in the province of Foggia
Gothic architecture in Apulia
Minor basilicas in Apulia